"Fool in Love" is a pop song written by Harry Vanda and George Young. It was recorded by Australian pop singer John Paul Young. The song was released in November 1978 as the fourth and final single from Young's fourth studio album Love Is in the Air (1978). The song peaked at number 58 on the Australian Kent Music Report in January 1979.

Track listing 
7" (AP 11831) 
Side A "Fool in Love" (H. Vanda and G. Young) - 3:00
Side B "It's All Over" (J. P. Young, Warren Morgan) - 2:42

Charts

References 

1978 songs
1978 singles
John Paul Young songs
Songs written by Harry Vanda
Songs written by George Young (rock musician)
Song recordings produced by Harry Vanda
Song recordings produced by George Young (rock musician)
Albert Productions singles